Marquess of Laserna is a hereditary title in the Peerage of Spain, granted in 2010 by Juan Carlos I to Iñigo Moreno, husband of his cousin Princess Teresa, Duchess of Salerno. It was conferred on him in compensation for his loss of the Marquessate of Laula in a judiciary battle against his namesake cousin Iñigo, 19th Duke of Infantado.

Marquesses of Laserna (2010)

Iñigo Moreno y de Arteaga, 1st Marquess of Laserna (b. 1934)

References

See also
Marquess of Laula
Infanta Alicia, Duchess of Calabria

Marquesses of Spain
Lists of Spanish nobility
Noble titles created in 2010